The Sevenfold Sun Miracle was an atmospheric phenomenon witnessed in Gdańsk in 1661. It was a complex halo phenomenon, and was described by Georg Fehlau, the pastor of the St Marien church, in a sermon two weeks later, which was then published under the title Siebenfältiges Sonnenwunder oder sieben Nebensonnen, so in diesem 1661 Jahr den 20. Februar neuen Stils am Sonntage Sexagesima um 11 Uhr bis nach 12 am Himmel bei uns sind gesehen worden ("Sevenfold sun miracle or seven sun dogs which were seen in our skies on Sexagesima Sunday, 20th of February of the year 1661 from 11 o'clock until after 12 o'clock") The same event was also described by the astronomer Johan Hevelius the following year in his book Mercurius in Sole visus Gedani.

The event
On 20 February 1661 a complex halo phenomenon was observed by more than 1000 people, including Fehlau and Hevelius, both astronomers, in the city of Gdańsk on the Baltic.

As well as the true Sun, two mock Suns (parhelia) and an anthelion were seen, with halos at 22° and 46°, and topped with an upper tangent arc and a circumzenithal arc, respectively. Of particular interest to modern scientists were the mention of three further mock Suns, one at the intersection of the 22° halo and the upper tangent arc, and two others at 90° to the Sun, also at the intersections of an immense but incomplete halo.

The first is thought to be a particularly bright Parry arc, mistakenly described as a parhelion. The other two and the associated halo, which has been labelled "Hevel's halo",  have no theoretical explanation, and have not been recorded since (though one possible sighting was reported in 1909). In the absence of conclusive evidence these observations are regarded as possibly being a misidentification of the rare but not unusual 120° parhelia.

The accounts
On 6 March, two weeks after the event, Fehlau preached at St Mary's church; taking the event, and the widespread interest it created, as his inspiration. His sermon was later published, and contains a full account of the phenomenon.

The following year Hevelius published his book Mercurius in Sole visus Gedani ("Mercury appeared in the Sun, at Gdansk"), principally on the observation of a transit of Mercury, but containing other astronomical information, including an account of the 1661 halos.

As the two accounts are virtually identical, and as Fehlau is known to have visited Hevelius on 3 March at his observatory to look at a comet, modern astronomers believe Fehlau and Hevelius collaborated on the text, though they generally give Hevelius (being the better-known of the two) the credit for the account.

Fehlau's account
The translation of Fehlau's account reads (notes added for clarity):

See also
The Vadersolstavlan; a depiction of a similar event at Stockholm, in 1535
Christoph Scheiner; published the first scientific description of a complex halo event at Rome in 1631
Tobias Lowitz (de); recorded a complex halo event, which included his Lowitz arc, at St Petersburg in 1790

Notes

References
Robert Greenler Rainbows, Halos and Glories (1980) Cambridge University Press 
John Naylor Out of the Blue; a 24 hour skywatchers guide (2002) Cambridge University Press 
Fred Schaaf The Starry Room; naked eye astronomy in the intimate universe  (1988 rev. 2002) Dover Publications 
Mark Vornhusen First report on the Danzig Halo Display at meteoros.de; retrieved 21 Sept 2016

External links
 Fehlau's book (catalogued) at the Herzog August Bibliothek, Wolfenbüttel
 "First report" article at meteoros.de (in German) with Fehlau's original text
Mercurius in Sole visus Gedani by Hevelius at Google Books; full text (in Latin)

Atmospheric optical phenomena
History of astronomy
1660s in Poland
1661 in science
History of Gdańsk
Events in Gdańsk